National Highway 848A, commonly called NH 848A is a national highway in  India.  It is a branch of National Highway 48. NH-848A traverses the states of Gujarat, Maharashtra and  the union territory of Dadra and Nagar Haveli and Daman and Diu.

Route 
Vapi - Dadra - Pipria(Piparia) - Silvassa - Ultanfalia - Bhurkudfalia - Khadol- Surangi -Velugam - Sutrakar - Talasari.

Junctions  
 
  Terminal near Vapi.
  Terminal near Talasari.

See also 
List of National Highways in India
List of National Highways in India by state

References

External links 

 NH 848A on OpenStreetMap

National highways in India
National Highways in Maharashtra
National Highways in Gujarat
National Highways in Dadra and Nagar Haveli and Daman and Diu